Claire Duhamel (September 6, 1925 – February 7, 2014) was a French film and stage actress, whose credits included Stolen Kisses in 1968 and Bed and Board in 1970. She died on February 7, 2014, at the age of 88.

Filmography

References

External links

1925 births
2014 deaths
French film actresses
French stage actresses
20th-century French actresses